Rami Koivisto (born April 23, 1968) is a Finnish former professional ice hockey centre.

Koivisto spent four seasons playing for Jokerit of SM-liiga between 1991 and 1995. He played 164 games, scoring 42 goals and 33 assists for 75 points. where he played  for HPK and scored one assist. He also played in France for Dragons de Rouen, Brest Albatros Hockey and Brûleurs de Loups.

Retired in 2003, Koivisto came out of retirement during the 2007–08 season, playing ten games with 2.Divisioona side NuPS Hockey. He later became head coach for Viikingit and NuPS.

References

External links

1968 births
Living people
Brest Albatros Hockey players
Brûleurs de Loups players
Dragons de Rouen players
Finnish ice hockey centres
Jokerit players
Ice hockey people from Helsinki